Jillie Cooper (born 9 May 1988) is a professional badminton player (BWF player id: 53127) who plays for Scotland.

Career
Cooper began her professional career in 2007. She first started playing senior international tournaments when she got to round '1/32' in the Scottish Open 2003 with her doubles partner in November 2003. Since then she had entered many other competitions building up to quarter and semi final stages. More recently she had become the winner of women's doubles for the first time in November 2008 in the Scottish Open, exactly 5 years after her first start there. Cooper then went on to win the Welsh International doubles and mixed Doubles titles one week after her Scottish Open success in December 2008.

As a mixed doubles player, she had reached semi finals stages in 5 competitions to date and the final of Belgian International in September 2008 (29 November 2008). Cooper was also a member of Team Scotland at the 2010 Commonwealth Games in Delhi and Glasgow 2014 Commonwealth Games.

Achievements

BWF International Challenge/Series
Women's doubles

Mixed doubles

 BWF International Challenge tournament
 BWF International Series tournament

References

External links

 

1988 births
Living people
Sportspeople from Edinburgh
Scottish female badminton players
Commonwealth Games competitors for Scotland
Badminton players at the 2014 Commonwealth Games
Badminton players at the 2010 Commonwealth Games